4-Methylhistamine is a histamine agonist selective for the H4 subtype.

References

Amines
Imidazoles